Ephelis brabanti is a moth in the family Crambidae. It is found in Algeria.

References

Moths described in 1908
Odontiini
Moths of Africa